Scots Church may refer to:
Scots Church, Adelaide
Scots Church, Amsterdam
 Scots Church, Cobh, Ireland
 Scots' Church, Melbourne
 Scots Church, Sydney
 Scots Church at Rotterdam